The 2015 Oadby and Wigston Borough Council election took place on 7 May 2015 to elect all 26 members of Oadby and Wigston Borough Council in England. This was on the same day as other local elections.

Ward Results

Brocks Hill (2)

Oadby Grange (3)

Oadby St Peter's (2)

Oadby Uplands (2)

Oadby Woodlands (2)

South Wigston (3)

Wigston All Saints (3)

Wigston Fields (3)

Wigston Meadowcourt (3)

Wigston St Wolstan's (3)

References

2015 English local elections
May 2015 events in the United Kingdom
2015
2010s in Leicestershire